Cinematic describes anything related to cinema. It may refer to: any movie updates, cinema nights, cinematic review

Film-related
 Cinematic cutscene, a sequence in a video game that is not interactive
 Cinematic music, original music written specifically to accompany a film
 Cinematic storytelling, a story told primarily through the use of visual media
 Cinematic techniques, a list of methods and techniques used in filmmaking

Music
 The Cinematics, a Scottish alternative-rock band
 Cinematic (EP), a 2008 EP by Tony Harnell
Cinematic, a 1995 album by Adrian Borland
 Cinematic (Illy album), released in 2013
 Cinematic (Owl City album), released in 2018

See also
 Cinema (disambiguation)